Afrolittorina is a genus of sea snails, marine gastropod mollusks in the family Littorinidae, the winkles or periwinkles.

Species
Species within the genus Afrolittorina include:

Afrolittorina acutispira (E.A. Smith, 1892)
Afrolittorina africana (Philippi, 1847)
Afrolittorina knysnaensis (Philippi, 1847)
Afrolittorina praetermissa (May, 1909)

References

External links

 
Littorinidae